Osbornia arborea is a species of tropiduchid planthopper in the family Tropiduchidae. It is found in North America.

Subspecies
These two subspecies belong to the species Osbornia arborea:
 Osbornia arborea arborea Ball, 1935
 Osbornia arborea fusca Doering, 1940

References

Articles created by Qbugbot
Insects described in 1935
Gaetuliini